Sakaryaspor Kulübü Derneği is a Turkish professional football club, formed in 1965 after the merger of Adapazarı Gençlerbirliği, Adapazarı İdman Yurdu, Güneşspor and Ada Gençlik. The club is better known as Sakaryaspor. The football club is nicknamed the "Football Factory" by Turkish football scene because of the many national footballers born and raised in the city. Sakarya Province has also five national top scorers (Hakan Şükür, Aykut Kocaman, Bülent Uygun, Aykut Yiğit, Ogün Altıparmak) of all time and three of them did carry the Sakaryaspor shirt. Sakaryaspor became TFF First League champions in 1980–81 and 1986–87. They accomplished this feat again at the end of the 2005–06 season. Sakaryaspor subsequently won a place in the play–off matches. After eliminating İstanbulspor in the first play–off match, Sakaryaspor went on to defeat Altay 4–1 in the finals and were promoted to the Süper Lig. They were relegated from the Süper Lig the following season. Currently the team is playing in the TFF Second League, which is the third level of Turkish football.
In 1988 the team won the Turkish Cup, with some of the Turkish football legends like Oğuz Çetin, Hakan Şükür, Engin İpekoğlu and Aykut Kocaman in the squad.

Supporters
Sakaryaspor fans call themselves "Tatangalar", which was founded in 1990 and means "Bisons". The name Tatanga (Tatanka) comes from the movie Dances with Wolves. The word Tatanga (plural Tatangalar) became the nickname of the club over time.

League participations
 Turkish Super League: 1981–86, 1987–90, 1998–99, 2004–05, 2006–07
 TFF First League: 1965–81, 1986–87, 1990–98, 1999–04, 2005–06, 2007–09, 2011–12, 2022– 
 TFF Second League: 2009–11, 2012–13, 2017–2022
 TFF Third League: 2013–17

Achievements
Second League Category A:
Winners (2): 2004, 2006
Second League: 
Winners (2): 1998, 2011 
Third League: 
Winners (1): 2017
Turkish Cup:
Winners (1): 1988

European participations

European Cup Winners' Cup:

Current squad

External links
Official website
Sakaryaspor on TFF.org

 
Association football clubs established in 1965
Sport in Adapazarı
Football clubs in Turkey
1965 establishments in Turkey
Süper Lig clubs